The Xuchang–Guangzhou Expressway, designated as G0421 and commonly abbreviated as Xuguang Expressway is an expressway in Central South China linking the cities of Xuchang and Guangzhou. This expressway is a branch of G4 Jinggang'ao Expressway.

Route

References

Expressways in Henan
Expressways in Hubei
Expressways in Hunan
Expressways in Guangdong
0421